La Raza are the people of the Hispanic and Chicano world.

La Raza may also refer to:

Arts and entertainment
La Raza (newspaper), a Chicano newspaper based in Los Angeles
La Raza (Chicago), a Spanish-language newspaper in Chicago published by ImpreMedia
La Raza (album), an album by Armored Saint
"La Raza" (song), a song by Kid Frost
"La Raza Cósmica", an essay by José Vasconcelos
KLAX-FM, a Spanish-language radio network in Los Angeles and San Francisco branded as "La Raza"
KGHD-LP, an FM radio station in Las Vegas, Nevada branded as "La Raza"
"La Raza", a filmmaking style by Zachary Laoutides

Political and community organizations
Católicos por La Raza, a Chicano-Catholic organization
El Centro de la Raza, a community center in Seattle
Centro Cultural de la Raza, a cultural center in San Diego, California
Galería de la Raza, a San Francisco Bay Area art gallery
National Council of La Raza, a political advocacy group
La Raza Nation, a Chicago-based gang
La Raza National Lawyers Association, a legal organization
Raza Unida Party, a Chicano nationalist party

Other uses
Día de la Raza or Columbus Day, the anniversary of Columbus' arrival in the Americas
Los Siete de la Raza, a group of seven youths accused of killing a police officer in San Francisco, California in 1969
La Raza metro station, in Mexico City
La Raza (Mexico City Metrobús, Line 1), a BRT station in Mexico City
La Raza (Mexico City Metrobús, Line 3), a BRT station in Mexico City

See also 
 Raza (disambiguation)
 Monterrey La Raza (disambiguation)
 Monumento a la Raza (disambiguation)